Qalandarabad is a city in Razavi Khorasan Province, Iran.

Qalandarabad may also refer to:

Iran 
 Qalandarabad-e Bala, Golestan Province
 Qalandarabad-e Pain, Golestan Province
 Qalandarabad, Rashtkhvar, Razavi Khorasan Province
 Qalandarabad District, in Razavi Khorasan Province
 Qalandarabad Rural District, in Razavi Khorasan Province

Pakistan 
 Qalandarabad, Pakistan